White House is a historic hotel in Herm, in the Channel Islands. Converted into a hotel from an old country house in 1949, the hotel contains 36 double rooms, 2 single rooms, 1 suite, and 21 rooms in 3 cottage annexes.

Fiona Duncan of The Daily Telegraph described the hotel as "one in which she wanted to buy", "a much-extended inn that makes a perfect hotel, with a pretty central staircase and light, spacious, public rooms with open fires leading to a cosy bar, a conservatory and a beautifully sited, palm-fringed outdoor swimming pool that could, if the poolside furniture were changed, be on the Amalfi Coast." It contains the terraced Ship Inn restaurant.

References

Herm
Hotels in the Channel Islands
Hotels established in 1949
Country houses in the Channel Islands